Novabase is a Portuguese IT company established in 1989.

References 

Companies based in Lisbon
Companies listed on Euronext Lisbon
Software companies of Portugal
Portuguese brands
Osvaldo:Orlando:Murriane
+258849515062